Santiago Andrés Ladino (born 21 October 1980 in Buenos Aires) is an Argentine football player.

Career 
Ladino started his professional career with Vélez Sársfield in 2000. He was part of the championship winning squad in the Clausura 2005 tournament. In 2006, after making 116 appearances for Vélez in all competitions he joined Lorca Deportiva in Spain.

On the last day of the August 2007 transfer window, he left Lorca to join Bari.

On 31 July 2009 Club Atlético Banfield signed the wingback on loan from Gimnasia de Jujuy where he was member of the squad that won the Apertura 2009 championship appearing in 6 games. On 13 December 2009 he celebrated with his team mates when Banfield won the Argentine championship for the first time in the history of the club.

Honours
Vélez Sársfield
Primera División Argentina (1): 2005 Clausura

Banfield
Primera División Argentina (1): 2009 Apertura

References

External links
 Argentine Primera statistics

1980 births
Living people
Footballers from Buenos Aires
Argentine footballers
Argentine expatriate footballers
Club Atlético Vélez Sarsfield footballers
Lorca Deportiva CF footballers
S.S.C. Bari players
Association football fullbacks
Expatriate footballers in Italy
Expatriate footballers in Spain
Argentine expatriate sportspeople in Italy
Argentine expatriate sportspeople in Spain
Gimnasia y Esgrima de Jujuy footballers
Club Atlético Banfield footballers
Atlético Tucumán footballers
All Boys footballers
Argentine Primera División players
Serie B players